Jack Finch may refer to:

 Jack Finch (conservationist) (1917–2006), American conservationist
 Jack Finch (footballer, born 1996), English footballer
 Jack Finch (footballer, born 1909) (1909–1993), English footballer and manager